Göhren-Lebbin is a municipality  in the Mecklenburgische Seenplatte district, in Mecklenburg-Vorpommern, Germany. The town part Untergöhren is located on the shore of the Fleesensee.

References